Organización Editorial Mexicana, also known as OEM, is the largest Mexican print media company and the largest newspaper company in Latin America. The company owns a large newswire service, it includes 70 Mexican daily newspapers, 24 radio stations and 44 websites.

Organización Editorial Mexicana was founded by Jose Garcia Valseca  The daily circulation of the print edition of La Prensa, one of OEM's newspapers, is more than 450,000 readers. It is considered the most widely read newspaper in Mexico City. According to Alexa.com, the online version of the media company is one of the most visited webpages in Mexico.

Organización Editorial Mexicana owns El Sol de México, ESTO and La Prensa. Circulation combined tops every news print media in the Mexican capital.

Mexican newspapers owned by OEM

Mexico city and metro area
 El Sol de México
 La Prensa
 ESTO
 El Sol de México/Mediodía
 Diario Deportivo Marcador
 Trato Directo

Central region
 El Occidental - Guadalajara, Jalisco
 El Sol de Guadalajara - Guadalajara, Jalisco
 ESTO Jalisco - Guadalajara, Jalisco
 La Prensa Jalisco - Guadalajara, Jalisco
 El Sol de San Luis - San Luis Potosí, San Luis Potosí
 La Prensa del Centro - San Luis Potosí, San Luis Potosí
 ESTO del Centro - San Luis Potosí, San Luis Potosí
 El Sol de Toluca - Toluca, Estado de México
 EXTRA de El Sol - Toluca, Estado de México
 El Sol del Centro - Aguascalientes, Aguascalientes
 El Sol de Morelia - Morelia, Michoacán
 El Sol de Zamora - Zamora, Michoacán
 Diario de Querétaro - Querétaro, Querétaro
 El Sol de Irapuato - Irapuato, Guanajuato
 El Sol de Salamanca - Salamanca, Guanajuato
 El Sol de San Juan del Río - San Juan del Río, Querétaro
 El Sol del Bajío - Celaya, Guanajuato
 Noticias Vespertinas - León, Guanajuato

Gulf of Mexico region
 Diario de Xalapa - Xalapa, Veracruz
 ESTO de Veracruz - Xalapa, Veracruz
 El Sol de Córdoba - Córdoba, Veracruz
 El Sol de Orizaba - Orizaba, Veracruz
 El Sol de Tampico - Tampico, Tamaulipas
 El Sol de la Tarde - Tampico, Tamaulipas

North region
 El Heraldo de Chihuahua - Chihuahua, Chihuahua
 El Heraldo de la Tarde - Chihuahua, Chihuahua
 El Mexicano - Ciudad Juárez, Chihuahua
 El Sol de Durango - Durango, Durango
 Diario de Durango - Durango, Durango
 El Sol de Parral - Hidalgo del Parral, Chihuahua
 El Sol de Zacatecas - Zacatecas, Zacatecas
 Noticias de El Sol de la Laguna - Torreón, Coahuila
 ESTO del Norte - Torreón, Coahuila

East region
 El Sol de Cuautla - Cuautla, Morelos
 El Sol de Cuernavaca - Cuernavaca, Morelos
 El Sol de Hidalgo - Pachuca, Hidalgo
 El Sol de Puebla - Puebla, Puebla
 La Voz de Puebla - Puebla, Puebla
 ESTO de Puebla - Puebla, Puebla
 El Sol de Tehuacán - Tehuacán, Puebla
 El Sol de Tlaxcala - Tlaxcala, Tlaxcala
 El Sol de Tulancingo - Tulancingo, Hidalgo

Pacific coast and northwest region
 Cambio Sonora - Hermosillo, Sonora
 El Sol de Acapulco - Acapulco, Guerrero
 El Sol de Mazatlán - Mazatlán, Sinaloa
 El Sol de Sinaloa - Culiacán, Sinaloa
 El Sol de Culiacán - Culiacán, Sinaloa
 La Prensa de Sinaloa - Mazatlán, Sinaloa
 ESTO de Sinaloa - Mazatlán, Sinaloa
 El Sol de Tijuana - Tijuana, Baja California
 ESTO de las Californias - Tijuana, Baja California
 La Voz de la Frontera - Mexicali, Baja California
 El Centinela - Mexicali, Baja California
 El Sudcaliforniano - La Paz, Baja California Sur

Southeast region
 Diario del Sur - Tapachula, Chiapas
 El Heraldo de Chiapas - Tuxtla Gutierrez, Chiapas
 ESTO de Chiapas - Tuxtla Gutierrez, Chiapas
 El Heraldo de Tabasco - Villahermosa, Tabasco

Companies owned by OEM
 Cartones Ponderosa 
 Graficas La Prensa
 Comercial Fletera Mexico
 Espectaculares Televisivos de Alta Definicion
 Ecofibras Ponderosa
 Productora Nacional de Papel
 Compañía Transportadora Nacional
 Estudios Tepeyac
 Informex

See also
Grupo Reforma
 List of newspapers in Mexico

References

External links
 OEM en Línea

Newspaper companies of Mexico
Publishing companies established in 1976
Mass media in Mexico City
1976 establishments in Mexico